The Trowbridge Dairy is a property with four buildings which was listed on the National Register of Historic Places in 1979.

The listing included four contributing buildings:  a main house, two barns, and a shed.  The main house was built by contractor Henry J. Wolcott in 1906.  J. Frank Trowbridge bought the property in 1909 and built a large barn to house three stallion horses;  he turned to dairying by 1919 and operated the property as a local dairy until driven out of business in the Depression, selling the property in 1933.

References

National Register of Historic Places in Park County, Montana
Buildings and structures completed in 1906
1906 establishments in Montana
Farms on the National Register of Historic Places in Montana
Dairy buildings in the United States